Nargesi (Persian: نرگسی) is an Iranian dish made with eggs, fried onion and spinach. It's spiced with salt, garlic, and pepper.
Its name, Narges means Narcissus flower.  It is a type of spinach omelette popular for breakfast.

See also 
 Nargesi Kebab
 Mirza-Qasemi
Baghali ghatogh
 Scrambled eggs
 Omelette

References  

Iranian cuisine
Indian cuisine
Egg dishes
Omelettes